The Corporate Affairs Commission (CAC) of Nigeria was established in 1990 vide Companies and Allied Matters Act no 1 (CAMA) 1990 as amended, now on Act cap C20 Laws of Federation of Nigeria. Its establishment, structure, and funding are now governed by the Companies and Allied Matters Act 2020 It is an autonomous body charged with the responsibility to regulate the formation and management of companies in Nigeria. It carries out its functions through accredited members of Association of National Accountants of Nigeria, Institute of Chartered Accountants of Nigeria, Institute of Chartered Secretaries and Administrators of Nigeria (ICSAN), and the Nigerian Bar Association (NBA). It is headed by a Registrar-General. Prior to the enactment of CAMA, these activities were carried on under the Companies Act 1968. (CA 1948)

Membership

The commission is made up of 10 members each representing the respective stakeholders, the board members are

 The chairman - Ademola Seriki
 The Registrar-General/CEO - A. G. Abubakar
 The representative of the Manufacturers Association of Nigeria (MAN) - Alhaji Ali S. Madugu, mni
 The representative of the Institute of Chartered Accountants of Nigeria (ICAN) - Mazi Nnamdi Anthony Okwuadigbo
 The representative of the Nigerian Bar Association (NBA) - Bello Aminu Abdullahi
 The representative of the Nigerian Association of Chambers of Commerce, Industry Mines and Agriculture (NACCIMA) -  Saratu Iya Aliyu
 The representative of the Federal Ministry of Industry, Trade, and Investment (FMITI )- Muhammad Danjuma Alhassan
 The representative of the Securities & Exchange Commission (SEC) - Ms. Frana Chukwuogor
 The representative of the Federal Ministry of Justice - Mrs. Antoinette Ifeanyi Oche-Obe

Services

Corporate Affairs Commission (CAC) Services are classified into segments:
 
PART A - Registry PART B - Registration of Business Names PART C - Registration of Incorporated Trustees (NGO’s)	

These classifications above covers the following services:
 Incorporation of Companies (Private or Public Company, Limited by guarantee)
 Registration of Business Name
 Registration of Incorporated Trustees
 Same Day Incorporation Services under which companies are registered within one day
 Conducting searches
 Issuance of Certified True Copies of filed documents
 Registration of share capital increases, mortgages, etc.
 Processing the statutory filings of Annual Returns, increase, changes in the memo and articles, addresses, etc.
 Arrange or conduct investigations into the affairs of any company where the interests of the shareholders and the public so demand.
 Management and winding-up of companies.
  Monitoring the Compliance with the CAMA by companies.
 Sale of all statutory forms and publications of the Commission
 Responding to inquiries and complaints in respect of the services of the Commission.
 Handling the preliminary process of accreditation of Lawyers, Chartered Accountants, and Chartered Secretaries who are recognized professionals and direct users of the Companies Registry.

Types of services
Four(4) types of companies are recognized for business ventures in Nigeria, namely:

 Private Limited Company (LTD)
 Public Limited Company (PLC)
 Companies limited by guarantee and
 Unlimited Companies.

The minimum membership for each of these companies is two except for Private Limited Company which is one, and the maximum for private companies is fifty members while there is no upper limit for public companies. A minimum share capital of ten thousand Naira is prescribed for private companies and five hundred thousand Naira for public companies with a minimum subscription of 25% of the shares.

See also 
 List of company registers

References

External links 
 

Government agencies of Nigeria
Registrars of companies